Jessica Goldberg (born 1975) is an American playwright, screenwriter, and television writer. In 1999, she won the Susan Smith Blackburn Prize for her play, Refuge. Goldberg is the creator of the Hulu series The Path and served as the showrunner for the Netflix series Away.

Early life and education 
Goldberg is from Provincetown, Massachusetts. She was raised Jewish and grew up in Woodstock, New York. Goldberg is a graduate of the dramatic writing program at New York University, and of the Juilliard School.

Career
She was a Tennessee Williams Fellow at the University of the South and a recipient of the Le Compte de Nouy stipend, the first annual Helen Merrill Award, and a 2000 Berrilla Kerr Foundation Award. She was also a resident at New River Dramatists, a member of the PEN American Center.

Her play What You Need was commissioned by the Atlantic Theater Company. Refuge premiered at Playwrights' Horizons and won the 1999 Susan Smith Blackburn Prize.

Goldberg's television and screen work includes "The Prince of Motor City" (2008) for ABC, starring Piper Perabo, Aidan Quinn, Andie MacDowell, Rutger Hauer, and Morris Chestnut.  Path created the television series The Path, which aired three seasons on Hulu before being cancelled in 2022. Goldberg served as the showrunner for the 2020 Netflix series Away. She received a Gracie Award in 2021 in the category, "Showrunner Fiction – Drama," for her work on Away.

Personal life 
Goldberg married actor and playwright Hamish Linklater in 2002. They later divorced but have one child, Lucinda Rose.

Works

Plays 
 Babe (2022)
 Better (2014)
 Affair Play
 Katzman and the Mayor
 The Schaubuhne
 Body Politic
 Sex Parasite
 
 
 
  Premiered at Theatre Off-Park, New York City in 1999
 The Hunger Education
 What You Need
 Ward 57

Screenplays 
 Cherry
 Absent Hearts
 The Amadou Ly Story for The Kennedy/Marshall Company
 Passing Strange for HBO
 Delerium for Mazur/Fox 2000
 Heart of a Soldier for Universal/Josh Schwartz

Filmography

Television

Film

References

External links

JESSICA GOLDBERG, doollee
2006 Theatre Conference photo
"9 Touchstones", Jessica Goldberg, Florida Stage

1975 births
Living people
American women dramatists and playwrights
American women screenwriters
21st-century American dramatists and playwrights
21st-century American screenwriters
21st-century American women writers
Tisch School of the Arts alumni
Juilliard School alumni
Sewanee: The University of the South fellows
People from Provincetown, Massachusetts
Showrunners
American women television producers
Television producers from Massachusetts
Jewish women writers